MacRumors.com is a website that aggregates Mac and Apple-related news and rumors. The site launched on February 24, 2000, in Richmond, Virginia, and is owned by Arnold Kim. By consolidating reports and cross-referencing claims, MacRumors aims to keep track of the rumor community and the website is updated daily with new articles. MacRumors is also known for occasionally breaking original stories, such as revealing the name of the iPad in 2010. The tagline of the website is "News and Rumors You Care About". MacRumors is a prominent website within the Apple community, featuring a forum with over one million members.

Content 
MacRumors is home to a large Mac-focused forum site with over 1,088,487 members and over 30,000,000 forum posts as of October 2022. The site hosts a specialized Buyer's Guide that recommends timeframes for purchasing Apple devices based on the products' last update. The website also has a corresponding YouTube channel, hosted by Dan Barbera, covering Apple products, reviews, tutorials, and more.

Business
As of April 30, 2012, according to Quantcast, MacRumors receives an average 65,890,912 page views globally per month, and 7,567,679 visitors per month globally. Website traffic often increases dramatically during Apple events, such as WWDC.

Sister sites 
TouchArcade is a mobile game news website that launched in 2008. Arnold Kim of MacRumors worked on the site. Kim also runs AppShopper, making the three "sister sites".

See also
 
 Apple community
 List of Internet forums

References

External links
  – official site

Internet forums
Internet properties established in 2000
Macintosh websites